Mauricio Galvao (21 January 1890 – 6 March 1945) was a German field hockey player. He competed in the men's tournament at the 1908 Summer Olympics. He was killed in action during World War II.

Personal life
Galvao served as a hauptmann (captain) in the German Army during the Second World War and was killed in action at Castelnuovo on 6 March 1945. He is buried at Zagreb War Cemetery.

References

External links
 

1890 births
1945 deaths
German male field hockey players
Olympic field hockey players of Germany
Field hockey players at the 1908 Summer Olympics
Field hockey players from Buenos Aires
German Army officers of World War II
German Army personnel killed in World War II
Argentine emigrants to Germany